Chooriyan is a Punjabi Indian family drama film directed by Sukhwant Dhadda, starring Gracy Singh, Vinod Khanna, Sudhanshu Pandey, and others. The movie released on 19 June 2015.

Plot
Simran, an orphan who has always wanted a large family, seems to have her dreams come true when she marries Aman, a soldier. When Aman dies in an accident, Simran must honor her vow to take care of the family and keep it united.

Cast
Cast of the film is-
 Gracy Singh
 Vinod Khanna
 Sudhanshu Pandey
 Vikas Bhalla
 Jonita Doda
 Parikshat Sahni
 Pankaj Dheer

Marketing
The trailer of the film was released on 28 May 2015 on YouTube.

References

External links 
 
 

2015 films
Punjabi-language Indian films
2010s Punjabi-language films